Fray Nicolás of Jesús María was a religious carmelita born in Seville, Spain, during the last years of the reign of Carlos II (1734-1759). His parents were Francisco Sánchez Risco and María de Merino, whom called him Nicolás Sánchez Risco y Merino.

He was a preacher recognised by his printed sermons that were praised in the opinions of other ecclesiastical authorities of the period. Also, he was prior of Orizaba, Oaxaca, Puebla and Mexico City.

Life 
At the beginning of the 18th century, fray Nicolás of Jesús María arrived to the Indians, as the American territory was known. After a year like novice, he received the habit of Carmen at the convent of Puebla of hands of fray Bartolomé of Saint Joaquín on 1 April 1708. Nicolas preached at the Convent of the Remedios de Puebla to later be moved to the capitular school of Santa Ana in 1715.

In 1717, fray Nicolás was in several convents until arriving at San Sebastián in Mexico. In 1720 it went into the school of theology and three years afterwards obtained the charge of reader of theology. This place was of big importance since in a trienio only there was one or two readers.

Preacher 
For the year of 1725 fray Nicolás returned to the convent of San Sebastián. On 11 November of the same year, he preached for the first time his sermon "La Mano de los Cinco Señores" with which began to win popularity because of his skill for the oratory. Later his sermons were printed matter, the majority of them in Mexico. Some of his sermons were written in honour to Santa Teresa.

Civil servant 
His fame as preacher promoted him to occupy some government charges like the presidency of the Hospice of Guadalajara in 1728.

Foundation of the Carmen in San Luis Potosí 
In 1735, fray Nicolás and his companion Fray José de la Asunción visited San Luis Potosí for the foundation of the Temple of Our Lady of Carmen. On 23 February 1749 he put the first stone for his construction. Fray Nicolás was the first carmelita in San Luis Potosí, where he won popularity because his sermons. After the foundation of the temple, returned to Mexico City to continue preaching his sermons in the convent of San Sebastián. Of these, "La Cátedra" it is the last print known.

References 

Discalced Carmelites
People from Seville
Spanish Roman Catholic missionaries
Roman Catholic missionaries in New Spain